Chame is a district (distrito) of Panamá Oeste Province in Panama. The population according to the 2000 census was 19,625; the latest official estimate (for 2019) is 31,373. The district covers a total area of 377 km2. The capital lies at the city of Chame.

Administrative divisions
Chame District is divided administratively into the following corregimientos:

Chame (capital)
Bejuco
Buenos Aires
Cabuya
Chicá
El Líbano
Las Lajas
Nueva Gorgona
Punta Chame
Sajalices
Sorá

References

Districts of Panamá Oeste Province